Comte is the French, Catalan and Occitan form of the word "count" (Latin: comes); comté is the Gallo-Romance form of the word "county" (Latin: comitatus).

Comte or Comté may refer to:
 A count in French, from Latin comes
 A county in France, that is, the territory ruled by a count
 La Comté, a commune in the Pas-de-Calais département of France
 Comté cheese, a French cheese from Franche-Comté

People with the surname
 Alfred Comte (1895–1965), Swiss aviation pioneer
 Auguste Comte (1798–1857), French philosopher
 Charles Comte (1782–1837), French lawyer, journalist and political writer
 Claudine le Comte (born 1950), Belgian fencer
 Fabienne Comte, French statistician
 Fernando Compte (1930–2013), founder and first president of the International Sambo Federation
 Ferran Soriano i Compte (born 1967), Spanish CEO of various football clubs, including Manchester City F.C.
 Harry Comte (1909—1945), Australian rules footballer
 Louis Comte (1788–1859), French magician
 Maurice Compte (born 1969), American actor
 Pere Compte (died 1506), Spanish Catalan architect
 Raphaël Comte (born 1979), Swiss politician

See also
 
 Vicomte, the French equivalent of a viscount 
 Franche-Comté, a traditional province of eastern France
 Conde (disambiguation), the Spanish, Portuguese and Galician term for Count
 Conte (disambiguation), the Italian term for Count
 Le Compte (disambiguation)